Greenup is a rural locality in the Goondiwindi Region, Queensland, Australia.

Geography 

The predominant land use is grazing on native vegetation.

History 
Greenup Provisional School opened on 11 March 1918, but closed in 1922 due to low student numbers. In 1923 it reopened as a half-time school sharing a teacher with the Warroo Road Provisional School (formrely the Coolmunda Provisional School). From 1930, it was a part-time school sharing a teacher with both the Warroo Road Provisional School and the Brush Creek school. However the closure of these other two schools allowed Greenup to return to full-time status, closing in 1940 due to low student numbers. On 7 February 1955 a new Greenup State School was opened which operated until 10 December 1976 when it closed due to insufficient students.

Education

There are no schools in the locality. The nearest primary schools are Texas State School in Texas to the south-west and the Inglewood State School in Inglewood to the north-west. These two schools both offer secondary education to Year 10, but there is no nearby school offering secondary education to Year 12. Stanthorpe State High School in Stanthorpe  to the east offers secondary schooling to Year 12 but it is sufficiently distant that distance education and boarding school would be other options.

References 

Goondiwindi Region
Localities in Queensland